XHER-FM is a radio station on 92.9 FM in Ciudad Cuauhtémoc, Chihuahua. The station is owned by Grupo BM Radio, the radio business of the Beltrán Montes family, and carries a romantic format known as Amor 92.9.

History
XHER began as XEER-AM 990, receiving its concession on October 15, 1954. It was owned by Eduardo Rivas Trujillo.

It migrated to FM in 2011, originally receiving the 89.7 frequency that became XHDP-FM in a swap between the two related stations.

In 2015, control passed from Martha Consuelo Trujillo Mendoza to Israel Beltrán Zamarrón. Trujillo Mendoza had taken control of the station in 1986. Another Beltrán family member became the concessionaire in 2022.

References

Radio stations in Chihuahua